The 2002 Nebraska gubernatorial election, held on November 5, 2002, featured incumbent Republican Governor of Nebraska Mike Johanns defeating his Democratic opponent Stormy Dean in a landslide.

This was the first gubernatorial election in Nebraska where the winning primary candidates chose their running mates after the primary election. Prior to this, both the governor and the lieutenant governor were chosen at the primary election. This was also the first gubernatorial election in which a Republican was re-elected in more than forty years.

Republican Party primary

Candidates
Mike Johanns, incumbent Governor of Nebraska
Robert J. Wicht

Results

Democratic Party primary

Candidates
Stormy Dean, insurance company executive
Luis R. Calvillo

Results

Nebraska Party primary

Candidates
Paul A. Rosberg, farmer

Results

General election

Predictions

Results

References 

Gubernatorial
2002
2002 United States gubernatorial elections